The 1902–03 Scottish Division Two was won by Airdrieonians. Both Airdrieonians and Motherwell were promoted to Division One.

Table

References

Scottish Football Archive

Scottish Division Two seasons
2